Smithtown Creek is a tributary of the Delaware River in Tinicum Township, Bucks County, Pennsylvania in the United States.

History
Smithtown was a village at the confluence of Smithtown Creek with the Delaware River and with the Pennsylvania Canal (Delaware Division). Joseph and Robert Smith, Quakers who had land here before 1783 began to make farm implements in 1800. Robert was granted a patent, signed by President John Adams and Secretary of State Charles Lee, for the Smith plow on 19 May 1800 for a number of improvements in the manufacturer of plows, including a mouldboard plow constructed of cast iron as opposed to iron sheathed wood which was available up until that time. Thomas Jefferson was one of his patrons. When Jefferson ordered one of his "best plows", Smith replied "Our plows are all the best".

Course and Statistics
Smithtown Creek was listed in the Geographic Names Information System on 1 February 1990 as identification number 1202537.

Crossings and Bridges
 Smithtown Road
 Cafferty Road
 Pennsylvania Route 32 (River Road)

References

Rivers of Bucks County, Pennsylvania
Rivers of Pennsylvania